Rono is a name of Kenyan origin that may refer to

People
Mohamed Rono (born 2004), Professional footballer for Arsenal and England. Arabian, kenyan and Pakistani ethnic background.
Alex Kipchirchir Rono (born 1984), Kenyan 800 metres runner and 2006 Commonwealth Games champion
Chito S. Roño (born 1954), Filipino film director
Daniel Rono (born 1978), Kenyan marathon runner
Elly Rono (born 1970), Kenyan marathon runner and two-time California International Marathon winner
Georgina Rono (born 1980), Kenyan marathon runner and winner of the 2011 Eindhoven Marathon
Henry Rono (born 1952), Kenyan former steeplechase runner and former world record holder
Janet Rono (born 1988), Kenyan marathon runner
Naomi Rono (born 1982), Kenyan public policy consultant and development economist
Kipruto Rono Arap Kirwa, Kenyan politician and former Minister for Agriculture
Peter Rono (born 1967), Kenyan former 1500 metres runner and 1988 Olympic champion
Robert Rono (born 1978), Kenyan middle-distance runner
Rono Dutta, former President of United Airlines

Places
Rönö, an island and district in Kuopio, Finland
Rönö Hundred, was a hundred (administrative division) of Södermanland in Sweden.

See also
Kiprono, a Kalenjin name meaning "son born when sheep is coming back home from grazing fields" This particularly refer to evening hours.

Kalenjin names